The Jiaqing Emperor (13 November 1760 – 2 September 1820), also known by his temple name Emperor Renzong of Qing, born Yongyan, was the sixth emperor of the Manchu-led Qing dynasty, and the fifth Qing emperor to rule over China proper, from 1796 to 1820. He was the 15th son of the Qianlong Emperor. During his reign, he prosecuted Heshen, the corrupt Manchu favorite of his father, and attempted to restore order within the Qing Empire while curbing the smuggling of opium into China.

Early years
Yongyan was born in the Old Summer Palace, 8 km (5 mi) northwest of the walls of Beijing. His personal name, "Yongyan" (永琰), was later changed to "Yongyan" (顒琰) when he became the emperor. The Chinese character for yong in his name was changed from the more common 永 to the less common 顒. This novelty was introduced by the Qianlong Emperor, who believed that it was not proper to have a commonly used Chinese character in an emperor's personal name due to the longstanding practice of naming taboo in the imperial family during ancient China period.

Yongyan was the 15th son of the Qianlong Emperor. His mother was Noble Consort Ling, the daughter of Wei Qingtai (魏清泰), an ethnic Han Chinese official whose family had been long integrated into the Manchu Eight Banners as part of a Han Banner.

The Qianlong Emperor originally had two other sons in mind for succeeding him, but both of them died early from diseases, hence in December 1773 he secretly chose Yongyan as his successor. In 1789, the Qianlong Emperor instated Yongyan as "Prince Jia of the First Rank" (嘉親王; or simply "Prince Jia").

Accession to the throne
In October 1795, the 60th year of his reign, the Qianlong Emperor announced his intention to abdicate in favour of Prince Jia. He made this decision because he felt that it was disrespectful for him to rule longer than his grandfather, the Kangxi Emperor, who was on the throne for 61 years. Prince Jia ascended the throne and adopted the era name "Jiaqing" in February 1796, hence he is historically known as the Jiaqing Emperor. For the next three years, however, the Jiaqing Emperor was emperor in name and rite only because decisions were still made by his father, who became a Taishang Huang (emperor emeritus) after his abdication.

After the death of the Qianlong Emperor in the beginning of February 1799, the Jiaqing Emperor took control of the government and prosecuted Heshen, a favourite official of his father. Heshen was charged with corruption and abuse of power, stripped of his titles, had his property confiscated, and ordered to commit suicide. Heshen's daughter-in-law, Princess Hexiao, a half-sister of the Jiaqing Emperor, was spared from punishment and given a few properties from Heshen's estates.

At the time, the Qing Empire faced internal disorder, most importantly the large-scale White Lotus (1796–1804) and Miao (1795–1806) rebellions, as well as an empty imperial treasury. The Jiaqing Emperor engaged in the pacification of the empire and the quelling of rebellions. He endeavored to bring China back to its 18th-century prosperity and power.

Renaming Vietnam
The Jiaqing Emperor refused the Vietnamese ruler Gia Long's request to change his country's name to Nam Việt. He changed the name instead to Việt Nam. Gia Long's Đại Nam thực lục contains the diplomatic correspondence over the naming.

Opposition to Christianity
The Great Qing Legal Code includes one statute titled "Prohibitions Concerning Sorcerers and Sorceresses" (禁止師巫邪術). In 1811, a clause was added to it with reference to Christianity. It was modified in 1815 and 1817, settled in its final form in 1839 under the Daoguang Emperor, and abrogated in 1870 under the Tongzhi Emperor. It sentenced Europeans to death for spreading Catholicism among Han Chinese and Manchus. Christians who would not repent their conversion were sent to Muslim cities in Xinjiang, to be given as slaves to Muslim leaders and beys.

Chinese nobility
The Jiaqing Emperor granted the title Wujing Boshi to the descendants of Tang essayist Han Yu.

Death and burial
On 2 September 1820, the Jiaqing Emperor died at the Rehe (Jehol) Traveling Palace (熱河行宫), 230 km (140 mi) northeast of Beijing, where the imperial court was in summer quarters. The Draft History of Qing did not record a cause of death. Some have alleged that he died after being struck by lightning, but others prefer the theory that he died of a stroke, as the emperor was quite obese. He was succeeded by his second son, Mianning, who became known as the Daoguang Emperor.

Renzong was interred amidst the Western Qing Tombs, 120 km (75 mi) southwest of Beijing, in the Chang (昌; lit. "splendid") mausoleum complex.

Family

Empress

 Empress Xiaoshurui (孝淑睿皇后) of the Hitara Clan (喜塔臘氏)Titles: Primary Consort of the Fifteenth Prince (十五王子福晋) → Princess Consort Jia of the First Rank (嘉親王妃) → Empress (皇后)
 Second daughter (2 June 1780 – 6 September 1783)
 Minning (宣宗 旻寧; 16 September 1782 – 26 February 1850), the Daoguang Emperor (道光帝), second son
 Princess Zhuangjing of the First Rank (莊靜固倫公主; 20 October 1784 – 27 June 1811), fourth daughter. Married Manibadala (瑪尼巴達喇; d. 1832) of the Tumed Borjigit clan in November/December 1802.
 Miscarriage at three months (18 August 1785)

 Empress Xiaoherui (孝和睿皇后) of the Niohuru Clan (鈕祜祿氏)Titles: Secondary Consort (侧福晋) → Noble Consort (貴妃) → Imperial Noble Consort (皇貴妃) → Empress (皇后) → Empress Dowager Gongci (恭慈皇太后)
 Seventh daughter (2 August 1793 – 16 July 1795)
 Miankai, Prince Dunke of the First Rank (惇恪親王 綿愷; 6 August 1795 – 18 January 1838), third son
 Mianxin, Prince Ruihuai of the First Rank (瑞懷親王 綿忻; 9 March 1805 – 27 September 1828), fourth son

Imperial Noble Consort

 Imperial Noble Consort Heyu (和裕皇貴妃) of the Liugiya Clan (劉佳氏) Titles: Mistress (格格) → Consort Xian (諴妃) → Noble Consort Xian (諴貴妃) → Dowager Imperial Noble Consort Xianxi (諴禧太皇貴妃)
 Prince Mu of the Second Rank (穆郡王; 4 February 1780 – 10 June 1780), first son
 Princess Zhuangjing of the Second Rank (莊敬和碩公主; 30 January 1782 – 4 April 1811), third daughter. Married Sodnamdorji (索特納木多布濟; d. 1825) of the Khorchin Borjigit clan on 24 December 1801.(one daughter)

 Imperial Noble Consort Gongshun (恭順皇貴妃) of the Niohuru Clan (鈕祜祿氏) Titles: Noble Lady Ru (如貴人) → Imperial Concubine Ru (如嬪) → Consort Ru (如妃) → Dowager Noble Consort Ru (如貴太妃)→ Dowager Imperial Noble Consort Ru (如太皇貴妃)
 Eighth daughter (8 March 1805 – 14 January 1806)
 Princess Huimin of the First Rank (慧愍固倫公主; 18 February 1811 – 28 June 1815), ninth daughter
 Mianyu, Prince Huiduan of the First Rank (惠端親王 綿愉; 8 March 1814 – 9 January 1865), fifth son

Consort

 Consort Shu (恕妃) of the Wanyan Clan (完顏氏)Titles: Secondary Consort (侧福晋)
 Consort Hua (華妃) of the Hougiya Clan (侯佳氏), personal name Liuniu (六妞)Titles: Servant (管女子) → Mistress (格格) → Imperial Concubine Ying (莹嫔) → Consort Hua (华妃)
 Sixth daughter (2 August 1789 – June/July 1790)

 Consort Zhuang (莊妃) of the Wanggiya Clan (王佳氏)Titles: Mistress (格格) → First Class Female Attendant Chun (春常在) → Noble Lady Chun (春貴人) → Imperial Concubine Ji (吉嬪) → Consort Zhuang (莊妃)
 Consort Xin (信妃) of the Liugiya Clan (劉佳氏)Titles: Noble Lady Xin (信贵人) → Imperial Concubine Xin (信嫔) → Dowager Consort Xin (信太妃)

Imperial Concubine

 Imperial Concubine Jian (簡嬪) of the Guangiya Clan (關佳氏)Titles: Mistress (格格)
 First daughter (14 May 1780 – 24 November 1783)

 Imperial Concubine Xun (遜嬪) of the Shen Clan (沈氏)Titles: Mistress (格格)
 Princess Hui'an of the Second Rank (慧安和碩公主; 31 December 1786 – June/July 1795), fifth daughter

 Imperial Concubine Chun (淳嬪) of the Donggiya Clan (董佳氏)Titles: Noble Lady Chun (淳贵人) → Imperial Concubine Chun (淳嫔)
 Imperial Concubine En (恩嬪) of the Uya Clan (烏雅氏)
 Imperial Concubine Rong (榮嬪) of the Liang Clan (梁氏)
 Imperial Concubine An (安嬪) of the Gūwalgiya Clan (瓜爾佳氏)Titles: First Class Female Attendant An (安常在) → Dowager Imperial Concubine Kaoan (皇考安嫔).

Noble Lady

 Noble Lady Yun (芸贵人) of a certain clanTitles: Noble Lady Yun (芸贵人)
 Noble Lady Yu (玉贵人) of a certain clanTitles: Noble Lady Yu (玉贵人)

First Class Female Attendant

 First Class Female Attendant Hui (慧常在) of a certain clanTitles: First Class Female Attendant Hui (慧常在)

Ancestry

In fiction and popular culture
 Portrayed by Yu Yang in War and Beauty (2004)
 Portrayed by Xin Baiqing Legend of Jiaqing (2005)
 Portrayed by Shaun Tam in Succession War (2018)
 Portrayed by Tang Jiatong in Story of Yanxi Palace (2018)
 Portrayed in Throne of Jade (2006), a historical fantasy novel by Naomi Novik.

See also 
 Chinese emperors family tree (late)

References

Citations

Sources

Further reading

External links 
 

 

1760 births
1820 deaths
Qing dynasty emperors
18th-century Chinese monarchs
19th-century Chinese monarchs
Persecution of Christians
1790s in China
1800s in China
1810s in China
Qianlong Emperor's sons